Plectidae is a family of nematodes belonging to the order Araeolaimida.

Genera

Genera:
 Anaplectus De Coninck & Schuurmans Stekhoven, 1933
 Arctiplectus Andrássy, 2003

References

Nematodes